This is a list of notable literary festivals in India. (The list is non exhaustive)

Andhra Pradesh
 Guntur International Poetry Festival (GIPF), first held on 21 June 2008

Arunachal Pradesh
 Arunachal Literature and Art Festival first held on 4 and 5 August.
Arunachal Literature Festival Held in the last week of November since 2018.

Assam
 Brahmaputra Literary festival at Guwahati.

Delhi

Bookaroo Festival of Children's Literature, since 2008
 Delhi Literature festival (February), since 2013
 Jashn-e-Rekhta (December), an Urdu festival, since 2015
  Rainbow Literature Festival (November), since 2019
Times LitFest, at the India Habitat Centre, since 2015

Goa
Goa Arts and Literature Festival (December), since 2010.

Gujarat
 Ahmedabad International Literature Festival
 Gujarat Literature Festival

Karnataka
 Bangalore Literature Festival,since 2012.
 Bangalore Business Literature Festival, since 2015.

Kerala
 Thirunalloor Kavyolsavam since 2007
 Mathrubhumi International Festival of Letters, since 2018.
 Kerala Literature Festival (January/February), since 2016.

Maharashtra
 Gateway Litfest (February/ March), since 2015.
Tata Literature Live (November), since 2010.
Times Litfest (December), since 2012.
Pune International Literary Festival (December), since 2013.
Orange City Literature Festival(November), since 2019.

Odisha
 Kalinga Literary Festival, since 2013 at Bhubaneswar.

Rajasthan
Jaipur Literature Festival, since 2006. World's largest free literary festival.

Tamil Nadu
 Lit for Life (January), since 2010.
 Chennai Literary Festival (January), since 2014.
 Queer Lit Fest, Chennai (July), since 2018, at Chennai.

Telangana
 Hyderabad Literary Festival (January), since 2010.

Uttar Pradesh
 Lucknow Literary Festival  (February), since 2013.
 AMU Literary Festival (March), since 2015.
 Gorakhpur Literary Fest, since 2018.
 Purvanchal Literary Festival, since 2018.
 Bundelkhand Literature Festival, since 2020,

Uttarakhand
 Valley of Words (November), since 2017. Also has a phygital, virtual experience since 2020.
Dehradun Literature Festival (August), since 2016.

West Bengal
 Apeejay Kolkata Literary Festival, since 2010.
 Apeejay Bangla Sahitya Utsob, since 2015.
 Chair Poetry Evenings, since 2018.

References

literary festivals
literary festivals
Lists of literary festivals